The 1991 French motorcycle Grand Prix was the tenth round of the 1991 Grand Prix motorcycle racing season. It took place on the weekend of 19–21 July 1991 at the Paul Ricard circuit

500 cc race report
Wayne Rainey started on pole, Mick Doohan started 2nd at .5 second, John Kocinski started 3rd and Kevin Schwantz started 4th on the grid. Doohan got the start from Schwantz, Eddie Lawson and Rainey. After a bad start, Kocinski crashed out hard on the first lap.

By the end of the first lap, Rainey is showing Doohan a front wheel and it's a 2-man fight for 1st very early with a 4-man group fighting for 3rd.

Rainey takes the lead from Doohan and Lawson and Schwantz remain behind to determine 3rd place.

On the last lap, Rainey expertly zigzags across the Mistral Straight, preventing Doohan from draft-passing, and Lawson wins his fight from Schwantz.

500 cc classification

References

French motorcycle Grand Prix
French
Motorcycle Grand Prix